River Valley High School (Also known as RVHS) is a public high school located in Yuba City, California. It was founded in 2005, and has grades 9-12.

History
The school, the second high school in the city after Yuba City High School, was built due to Measure SS, a $30.6 million bond measure which was approved by local voters in 1999.

Notable alumni

References

Educational institutions established in 2005
High schools in Sutter County, California
Yuba City, California
Public high schools in California
2005 establishments in California